The Woodland Park District is a historic district of 63 single-family houses and multi-family dwellings in Saint Paul, Minnesota, United States. It is roughly bounded by Marshall and Selby Avenues and Arundel and Dale Streets. The area is an island within the Historic Hill District.  It was added to the National Register of Historic Places in 1978.

References

External links

 NRHP Nomination Form
 List of contributing properties

Geography of Saint Paul, Minnesota
Historic districts on the National Register of Historic Places in Minnesota
Houses in Saint Paul, Minnesota
National Register of Historic Places in Saint Paul, Minnesota
Queen Anne architecture in Minnesota
Victorian architecture in Minnesota